David Singer may refer to:

David Singer (poker player), American poker player
David M. Singer, publisher of Deluxe Comics
J. David Singer (1925–2009), American professor of political science